The Leo Triplet (also known as the M66 Group) is a small group of galaxies about 35 million light-years away in the constellation Leo.  This galaxy group consists of the spiral galaxies M65, M66, and NGC 3628.

Members
The table below lists galaxies that have been consistently identified as group members in the Nearby Galaxies Catalog, the Lyons Groups of Galaxies (LGG) Catalog, and the group lists created from the Nearby Optical Galaxy sample of Giuricin et al.

Member list

Additionally, some of the references cited above indicate that one or two other nearby galaxies may be group members. NGC 3593 is frequently but not consistently identified as a member of this group.

Nearby groups
The M96 Group is located physically near the Leo Triplet.    These two groups may actually be separate parts of a much larger group,
and some group identification algorithms actually identify the Leo Triplet as part of the M96 Group.

See also
 NGC 5866 Group – another small group of galaxies

References

External links
 The Leo Triplett (M66 group) at messier.seds.org
 
 
 Finder chart at freestarcharts.com (PDF format) 

 
Leo (constellation)
317